Osmanthus suavis, the sweet olive or sweet osmanthus, is a species of flowering plant in the family Oleaceae, native to the slopes of the Eastern Himalayas. Its leaves are dark green and lanceolate to oblong in shape. It grows in dense forests and thickets on slopes.

References

suavis
Flora of Tibet
Flora of South-Central China
Flora of Nepal
Flora of East Himalaya
Flora of Assam (region)
Flora of Myanmar
Plants described in 1882